The 1957–1958 St. Francis Terriers men's basketball team represented St. Francis College during the 1957–58 NCAA University Division men's basketball season. The team was coached by Daniel Lynch, who was in his tenth year at the helm of the St. Francis Terriers. The team was a member of the Metropolitan New York Conference and played their home games at the II Corps Artillery Armory in Park Slope, Brooklyn.

The Terriers finished their season at 14–9 overall and 2–1 in conference play.

During the season, Lester Yellin became the sixth player to join the Terrier 1,000 point club. It occurred against Pace on February 8, 1958. Yellin went on to become the Terrier head coach from 1969–73, taking the reins after Lynch retired. Against Ithaca, Anthony D'Elia also joined the 1,000 point club- he was the fifth member.

In the 1958 NBA Draft, senior Alvin Innis was selected with the 40th overall pick by the Minneapolis Lakers. During his senior year, Innis was second in the country with 24.8% rebound percentage.

Roster

Schedule and results

|-
!colspan=12 style="background:#0038A8; border: 2px solid #CE1126;;color:#FFFFFF;"| Regular Season

NBA Draft
At the end of the season Alvin Inniss was selected with the 40th overall pick by the Minneapolis Lakers.

Awards

Anthony D'Elia

All-Metropolitan selection by the Metropolitan Basketball Writers’ Association
Alvin Innniss

All-Metropolitan Selection by the Metropolitan Basketball Writers’ Association.

References

External links
 St. Francis Terriers men's basketball official website

St. Francis Brooklyn Terriers men's basketball seasons
St. Francis
Saint Francis
Saint Francis